Nationality words link to articles with information on the nation's poetry or literature (for instance, Irish or France).

Events

Works published

Great Britain
 John Cleveland, The Character of a London Diurnall, anonymously published
 Francis Quarles:
 Barnabas and Boanerges: Or, wine and oyle for afflicted soules, Part 2 also published this year in an unauthorized edition as Barnabas and Boanerges; both parts published together under the title Judgement and Mercie for Afflicted Soules 1646
 The Shepheards Oracle

Other
 Johann Klaj and Georg Philipp Harsdörffer, Pegnesische Schäfergedicht

Births
Death years link to the corresponding "[year] in poetry" article:
 Matsuo Bashō (died 1694), famous poet of the Edo period in Japan, especially Haiku
 Isaac Chayyim Cantarini (died 1723), Italian poet, writer, physician, rabbi and preacher
 Frances Norton, Lady Norton (died 1731), English poetry religious poet and prose writer

Deaths
Birth years link to the corresponding "[year] in poetry" article:
 Nicholas Bourbon (born 1574), French clergyman and neo-Latin poet
 Peter Hausted (born 1605), playwright, poet, preacher
 Geoffrey Keating (born 1569), Irish Roman Catholic priest, poet and historian
 Rhys Prichard (born 1579), Welsh language poet and a vicar
 Francis Quarles (born 1592), English
 George Sandys (born 1578), English traveller, colonist and poet, the seventh and youngest son of Church of England Archbishop Edwin Sandys
 Luís Vélez de Guevara (born 1579), Spanish dramatist, poet, and novelist

See also

 Poetry
 17th century in poetry
 17th century in literature
 Cavalier poets in England, who supported the monarch against the puritans in the English Civil War

Notes

17th-century poetry
Poetry